Social Welfare is a Pakistani football team which competes in the PFF League.

History 
Social Welfare was defeated when it made its debut against Sui Southern Gas, 4–1. In 2014, they competed in the 2014-15 PFF League. They ended at the end of the table. In 2020-21 PFF League, they were in the Group B.

References 

Football clubs in Pakistan
Association football clubs established in 2013
2013 establishments in Pakistan